André Picard may refer to:

 André Picard (rower) (born 1951), French lightweight rower
 André Picard (journalist), Canadian journalist